Camden Riley (born August 20, 1996) is an American soccer player who currently plays for San Diego Loyal in the USL Championship.

Career

College and amateur
Riley played four years of college soccer at the University of the Pacific between 2015 and 2018, making a total of 66 appearances, scoring 19 goals and tallying 10 assists for the Tigers. Riley finished his collegiate soccer career as the Tigers' all-time goal scoring leader, surpassing Tristan Blackmon.

While at college, Riley also appeared for USL PDL sides Burlingame Dragons and Portland Timbers U23s.

Professional
On January 11, 2019, Riley was selected 45th overall in the 2019 MLS SuperDraft by Sporting Kansas City. On February 20, 2019, Riley joined Sporting KC's USL Championship side Swope Park Rangers. 

On March 4, 2021, Riley signed with Rio Grande Valley FC.

Riley joined San Diego Loyal on January 26, 2022.

Style of play
Rio Grande Valley FC Toros head coach Wilmer Cabrera described Riley as "tall, athletic, very technical and with an engine to run box to box during the whole game."

References

External links
 
 Pacific Tigers profile
 

1996 births
Living people
American soccer players
Association football midfielders
Burlingame Dragons FC players
Pacific Tigers men's soccer players
Portland Timbers U23s players
Rio Grande Valley FC Toros players
San Diego Loyal SC players
Soccer players from Dallas
Sporting Kansas City draft picks
Sporting Kansas City II players
USL Championship players
USL League Two players